The GER Class L77, LNER Class N7, is a class of 0-6-2T steam locomotives.  They were designed by Alfred John Hill of the Great Eastern Railway and introduced in 1915. The design was perpetuated by Nigel Gresley of the LNER after the 1923 grouping. 134 were built and one example is preserved.

Overview
The N7s had superheaters and piston valves. They were unusual (for inside-cylinder locomotives) in having Walschaerts valve gear. They were, as London suburban locomotives, fitted with Westinghouse air brakes.

Some were fitted with condensing apparatus for working on the Metropolitan line and the East London Line but the condensing apparatus was removed between 1935 and 1938.

Numbering
The first 22 were allocated numbers in the 990–1011 range when ordered by the GER, but the last 10 did not emerge until the grouping. The LNER added 7000 to their GER numbers, and then built a further 112 locomotives between 1925 and 1928.  In the 1946 renumbering scheme, they were renumbered 9600–9733, and upon nationalisation in 1948, British Railways added 60000 to their number (69600–69733).

Sub-classes

 N7 Introduced 1914, GER Class L77 with Belpaire firebox
 N7/1 Introduced 1925, LNER development of GER design with Belpaire firebox
 N7/2 Introduced 1926, LNER locos with Belpaire firebox and long-travel valves
 N7/3 Introduced 1927, LNER locos with round-top firebox, plus from 1943, rebuilds of N7/2 with round-top firebox
 N7/4 Introduced 1940, GER locos rebuilt with round-top firebox
 N7/5 Introduced 1943, N7/1 locos rebuilt with round-top firebox

Accidents and incidents
On 24 May 1954, locomotive No. 69638 ran into the turntable pit at Hatfield, Hertfordshire following the removal of the turntable.

Preservation

One LNER example, No. 7999 (BR No. 69621) has been preserved and is currently on static display pending overhaul at the East Anglian Railway Museum at Chappel & Wakes Colne. It is owned by the East Anglian Railway Museum. It was the last engine built by the Great Eastern Railway's Stratford Works in 1924 and was preserved in 1962. It was also named in honour of its designer A J Hill in 1989.

References

Sources

 Ian Allan ABC of British Railways Locomotives, 1948 edition, part 4, pp 54–55

External links 

 LNER encyclopedia
 Class N7 Details at Rail UK
 Class N7/1 Details at Rail UK
 Class N7/2 Details at Rail UK
 Class N7/3 Details at Rail UK
 Class N7/4 Details at Rail UK
 Class N7/5 Details at Rail UK

L77
0-6-2T locomotives
William Beardmore and Company locomotives
Robert Stephenson and Company locomotives
Railway locomotives introduced in 1915
Condensing steam locomotives
Standard gauge steam locomotives of Great Britain
Passenger locomotives